123.Net Inc., also known as 123NET, is a telephone, Internet, and colocation provider headquartered in Southfield, Michigan, in the United States. It was one of the first Competitive Local Exchange Carriers to interconnect with AT&T and Verizon for the purposes of offering services through the public switched telephone network. The company operates as an independent and privately held telecommunications provider with services in the midwestern United States.

123NET is most known for its Southfield and Grand Rapids based data centers (DC1–DC4) and its extensive Wireless and Fiber-optic network in Michigan.

History
123NET was founded primarily as a dialup ISP in 1995. By 1996, 123NET had their first business customer, and the business sector grew over the next  25 years with additional services like Fiber, Fixed Wireless, Voice, and Data Center solutions. In 2021, 123NET started providing residential fiber internet services with a Pilot Program in Farmington Hills, MI. 

 1995 - Internet123 was Founded
 1998 - Purchased Ownership Stake in Telnet Worldwide 
 2001 - Started Offering Data Center Services at 24700 Northwestern Hwy, Southfield MI
 2002 - Installed & Turned Up Telica Phone Switch
 2006 - Established HQ in 24275 Northwestern Hwy, Southfield MI
 2007 - First Customer Connected with Fiber
 2008 - Data Center Services Expanded in 24245 Northwestern Hwy, Southfield MI
 2009 - Started Offering Fixed Wireless Offerings
 2010 - Officially named 123NET, Inc
 2010 - Acquired West Michigan Assets which became 123NET's West Michigan Data Center
 2011 - Completed Configuration & Construction of the 1st Hot-Aisle Cold-Aisle Containment System at 24245 Northwestern Hwy, Southfield MI
 2013 - Purchased 24700 Northwestern Hwy, Southfield MI as Headquarters and Data Center Space
 2014 - Founded the Detroit Internet Exchange (DET-iX)
 2015 - Hit 100 Employee Milestone
 2018 - Opened Novi Fiber Yard for Fiber Crews & Equipment Storage
 2019 - Turn-Up of Dedicated DTE Substation at 24700 Northwestern Hwy, Southfield MI
 2021 - Established DET-iX as Non-Profit
 2021 - First Residential Customer Turned-Up in Farmington Hills, MI
 2022 - Hit 250 Employee Milestone
 2022 - Added Security Options to Service Portfolio
 2022 - Bought Dedicated Fixed Wireless Frequency LMDS 29-31 GHz

Acquisitions
123NET has acquired assets or bought the following companies' networks:
 T2 Communications of Holland, MI in April 2015
 Michigan Network Services in October 2014
MICA.Net in July 2014
 West Michigan Internet Services (WMIS) in January 2011
 2020 Communications in February 2010 (Wireless Washtenaw, some assets later sold to Air Advantage)
 Waypoint Telecommunications and Waypoint Fiber Networks in July 2010 (Purchase fiber assets)
 Zing Networks (Acquired wireless assets in September 2009)

Leadership
Dan Irvin - Founder, CEO, President

Chuck Irvin - Vice President

James Kandler - COO

Ryan Duda - CTO

Stefania Stoenica - CFO

References

External links
 123NET Website

Telecommunications companies established in 1995
Telecommunications companies of the United States
Companies based in Southfield, Michigan
1995 establishments in Michigan
American companies established in 1995
Internet service providers
Technology companies established in 1995
Telecommunication services